Alive, She Cried is the second official live album by the American rock band the Doors, released in October 1983 by Elektra Records. It is the follow-up to the 1970's Absolutely Live, produced by Paul A. Rothchild. The album's title was taken from a line in the song "When the Music's Over".

Background
Following a resurgence in the band's popularity due to the 1979 film, Apocalypse Now featuring "The End", and the 1980 release of the first Doors compilation album in seven years, Greatest Hits, the push was on to release more Doors' music.

The recordings are from various concerts during the period of 1968 to 1970 including shows in Los Angeles, New York, Detroit, Boston and Copenhagen. Songs include "Gloria", originally a hit for Them, and an extended version of the Doors' best known song "Light My Fire". John Sebastian of the Lovin' Spoonful joined the band on stage to play harmonica on Willie Dixon's "Little Red Rooster". The album was discontinued following the 1991 release of In Concert, a double-album which included all of the songs from Alive, She Cried and Absolutely Live, as well as a few other additional live tracks.

Reception

In a contemporary review for The Village Voice, music critic Robert Christgau wrote that the tapes are "of some quality" and Morrison is effective when he focuses on singing, but the album is marred by moments "when he emits his poetry" and "narcissistic" come-ons.

Rolling Stones Parke Puterbaugh rated it four out of five stars, explaining that it "brings... the Doors' impossibly strange and wonderful music, Morrison's drunken loutishness and his stabbingly sober poetics, and the brilliant, vivid sparking of a machine too mercurial to last." He concluded by stating that "'Light My Fire'... flares upward into an intensifying bolt of passion that crescendos with... a scream signifying the communal orgasm of a generation and a decade and a band that would flame out and fall silent all too quickly."

In a retrospective review, AllMusic's Bruce Eder said that Alive, She Cried "helped solve [Absolutely Live's] problem [of leaving] more casual fans rather cold, owing to the absence of any of their biggest hits". However, he pointed out that "it also revealed the reason why 'Light My Fire' had not made it onto the prior live album".

Track listing
All songs written by the Doors, except where noted. Songwriters and track lengths are taken from the 1983 Elektra Records album and may differ from other sources.

Personnel
Per liner notes:The Doors Jim Morrison – vocals
 Robby Krieger – guitar
 Ray Manzarek – organ, keyboard bass
 John Densmore – drumsAdditional musicians John Sebastian – harmonica on "Little Red Rooster"Technical'
 Bill Gazecki – engineer
 Jim Marshall – photo
 Jeff Lancaster – design

Charts

Certifications

References

Albums produced by Paul A. Rothchild
The Doors live albums
1983 live albums